ETR No. 9 is an operational 0-6-0 steam locomotive built by the Montreal Locomotive Works in 1923. Originally purchased by the Essex Terminal Railway, the locomotive was in active service until 1960. It is currently owned by the Southern Ontario Locomotive Restoration Society, and is operated as a tourist attraction as part of the Waterloo Central Railway, in St. Jacobs, Ontario.

First career 
The locomotive was built by the Montreal Locomotive Works, based on a design by its parent, the American Locomotive Company. It was completed in February 1923, Serial # 64276. A 0-6-0 Switcher, it was purchased by the Essex Terminal Railway, (ETR) a shortline operator in the Windsor, Ontario area. The locomotive saw active duty until 1960, making it the last steam locomotive in Canada to be certified for regular revenue service.

Between 1960 and 1963, it was used as an external boiler to heat a building, before finally being placed into storage. In 1971, it was loaned to the Ontario Railway Association for restoration. The association moved the locomotive into storage in Milton, Ontario, but otherwise performed no restoration work.

Restoration 
In April 1986, it was leased to the Southern Ontario Locomotive Restoration Society (SOLRS). In July 1986, it was moved to the Ontario Hydro generating station at Nanticoke, Ontario where restoration work began. In December 1993 it was moved to St. Thomas, Ontario, where SOLRS had acquired a portion of the Elgin County Railway Museum, located in the former Michigan Central Railway (MCR) locomotive erecting shop. It was here that the restoration was completed. The locomotive was re-certified to operate under its own power in October 1997.

St. Thomas Operation 
In July 1998 SOLRS began to operate ETR No. 9 as a tourist attraction, naming it the St. Thomas Central Railway, and running on the Canada Southern Railway line (CASO), which at the time was owned and maintained by CN and CP.

In October 2001 SOLRS was finally granted ownership of the locomotive. During its time in St. Thomas, ETR No. 9 was given the name “Pride of Elgin.” In September 2002, the locomotive briefly returned to the Windsor area, to participate in the Essex Terminal Railway's 100th anniversary celebrations.

CN and CP had purchased the CASO line from MCR in 1985, primarily to acquire the railway's tunnel under the Detroit River, and their bridge at Niagara Falls. But the companies had little interest in maintaining the rest of the line, and gradually began to abandon it, section by section. Unable to afford to maintain the track as well as the locomotive and its rolling stock, SOLRS eventually decided to move their operation to St. Jacobs, Ontario.

St. Jacobs Operation 
Beginning in 2007, SOLRS began to run ETR No. 9 as part of their operation in St. Jacobs, which is named the Waterloo Central Railway. The former CN Waterloo Spur is used, which is owned and maintained by the Region of Waterloo, and which is also used by the Goderich-Exeter Railway for freight operations.

SOLRS also owns three diesel locomotives, which are the primary engines used for their tourist train service, between St. Jacobs Farmers' Market Station and the station at Elmira, Ontario. However No. 9 is also run frequently, usually on Saturdays and long weekends, and for specially named themed excursions.

References

Steam locomotives of Canada
C steam locomotives
0-6-0 locomotives